This is a list of state visits made by Nikola Gruevski, the 6th Prime Minister of Macedonia.

Visits

References

State visits by Macedonian leaders
Politics of North Macedonia
North Macedonia politics-related lists
Diplomatic visits by heads of government